The 1994 United States Senate election in Wisconsin was held November 8, 1994. Incumbent Democrat U.S. Senator Herb Kohl won re-election to a second term.

Major candidates

Democratic 
 Herb Kohl, incumbent U.S. Senator

Republican 
 Robert Welch, State Representative
 Cathy Zeuske, State Treasurer

Results

See also 
 1994 United States Senate elections

References

External links 

Wisconsin
1994
1994 Wisconsin elections